S. orientalis may refer to:
 Sarda orientalis, the striped bonito, a marine fish species found through the Eastern and Indo-Pacific
 Serapias orientalis, an orchid species found from the east-central and eastern Mediterranean to the western Transcaucasus
 Serrata orientalis, a sea snail species
 Shenzhousaurus orientalis, a basal ornithomimosaur species from the Lower Cretaceous of China
 Sinhalestes orientalis, a damselfly species endemic to Sri Lanka
 Stalpersia orientalis, a mushroom species
 Stigmella orientalis, a moth species found only on Kyushu, Japan
 Streptomyces orientalis, a bacterium species 
 Synodus orientalis, a lizardfish species found mainly in the Northwest Pacific

Synonyms 
 Securigera orientalis, a synonym for Coronilla iberica, an ornamental plant species
 Steiracrangon orientalis, a synonym for Crangon crangon, a commercially important shrimp species found mainly in the southern North Sea, although also found in the Irish Sea, Baltic Sea, Mediterranean Sea and Black Sea, as well as off much of Scandinavia and parts of Morocco's Atlantic coast
 Strix orientalis, a synonym for Strix seloputo, the spotted wood-owl, an owl species found in many regions surrounding Borneo, but not on that island itself

See also 
 Orientalis (disambiguation)